Tony Richards is an American musician who was the original drummer of classic heavy metal band W.A.S.P. from 1982 until 1984.

Richards played for various bands in his early career before relocating to the Los Angeles area from Phoenix, AZ in 1980.  He began making a name for himself as one of the hottest drummers in the LA heavy metal scene with a band called Dante Fox, later to become known as Great White.  With bandmates Don Costa (W.A.S.P./M80), Mark Kendall (Great White), and Jack Russell (Great White), they regularly played the most popular heavy metal clubs in Hollywood and LA such as the Troubador, Roxy Theatre, Whisky a Go Go, and Starwood.

In late 1982, Richards, soon followed by Costa, left Dante Fox after being asked by Blackie Lawless to join the new band he was assembling called W.A.S.P.  Richards left the band for unspecified reasons following the release of their debut album W.A.S.P. in 1984, being replaced by Steve Riley, who would later leave to join L.A. Guns.

Richards is currently playing in a band called DellaVella along with Carl Della Vella on bass guitar and Lee Oliver on lead guitar.

External links 

History of Tony Richards – W.A.S.P. & Great White days – Interview Part I
Tony Richards – W.A.S.P. days – Interview Part II
DellaVella official website

Living people
American heavy metal musicians
American rock drummers
W.A.S.P. members
1957 births